Covers 2 may refer to:

 Covers 2 (Show of Hands album), 2010
 Covers 2 (Beni album), 2012